Herbert Jepson (June 6, 1908 – July 2, 1993) was an American artist and designer. He founded the Jepson Art Institute in Los Angeles in 1945; among his students were Larry Bell and Joe Goode. He was the father of poet Elena Karina Byrne.

External links
Herbert Jepson: Images and Biography
Interview of Herbert Jepson, part of Los Angeles Art Community - Group Portrait, Center for Oral History Research, UCLA Library Special Collections, University of California, Los Angeles.
Herbert Jepson's obituary

American artists
1908 births
1993 deaths